Sun Dong (born 3 January 1992) is a Chinese footballer currently playing as a midfielder for Jiangxi Beidamen.

Career statistics

Club
.

Notes

References

1992 births
Living people
Chinese footballers
Association football midfielders
China League Two players
China League One players
Shandong Taishan F.C. players
Shandong Tengding F.C. players
Jiangxi Beidamen F.C. players